Rebar detailing is the discipline of preparing 'shop/placing' or 'fabrication' drawings or shop drawings of steel reinforcement for construction.

Architects and Engineers prepare 'design drawings' that develop required strengths by applying rebar size, spacing, location, and lap of steel.

By contrast, 'shop/placing drawings' or 'fabrication drawings' apply the intent of the 'design drawings' for the ironworker. These designs specify the quantity, description, placement, bending shapes with dimensions and laps of the reinforcing steel. Various applications are used to produce bar bending schedules which can be directly fed into CNC machines that cuts and bends the rebar to the desired shapes.

The fabrication of the bars is scheduled and the placing/fixing sequence indicated, adding the elements required to support those bars during construction.

'Shop/placing drawings' are submitted to the architect or engineer for review of compliance with design drawings before construction can proceed. These drawings must be detailed using the ACI & CRSI Specifications (United States), ACI & RSIC Specifications (Canada) BS Specifications (United kingdom).

Rebar detailing is usually assigned to in-house rebar fabricators or rebar detailing companies. The great majority of rebar detailing companies are stationed in The Middle East and India. The earnings for a rebar detailer in the US and Canada is from $30,000 to $90,000 per year on average but outsourcing is common due to substantially lower wages overseas.

Structural engineering
Construction documents